Arthur Kirkland may refer to:
 Arthur Kirkland, a fictional character from the film ...And Justice for All
 Arthur Kirkland, the national personification of England (and the United Kingdom) from the webmanga series Hetalia: Axis Powers

See also
 Arthur (disambiguation)
 Kirkland (disambiguation)